The China National Philatelic Corporation (CNPC) is the primary agency authorized by China Post Group Corporation of the PRC to sell national stamps, other philatelic items, and provide other philatelic services to the public. It is a state-owned corporation.

See also 
 State Post Bureau
 China Post

References

External links 
 China Philately Information official site 

China Post
Postal organizations
Philately of China
Government-owned companies of China
Companies based in Beijing